Abbotsford is a city located in British Columbia, adjacent to the Canada–United States border, Greater Vancouver and the Fraser River. With an census population of 153,524 people it is the largest municipality in the province outside metropolitan Vancouver. Abbotsford-Mission has the third highest proportion of visible minorities among census metropolitan areas in Canada, after the Greater Toronto Area and the Greater Vancouver CMA. It is home to Tradex, the University of the Fraser Valley, and Abbotsford International Airport.

As of the 2021 census, it is the largest municipality of the Fraser Valley Regional District and the fifth-largest municipality of British Columbia. The Abbotsford–Mission metropolitan area of around 195,726 inhabitants as of the 2021 census is the 23rd largest census metropolitan area in Canada. It has also been named by Statistics Canada as Canada's most generous city in terms of charitable donations for nine straight years.

The municipality's southern boundary is the Canada–United States border. In Canada, it is bordered by the Township of Langley to the west, the City of Mission to the north, and the City of Chilliwack to the east. Abbotsford borders the town of Sumas, Washington, to the south. Much of Abbotsford has views of Mount Baker (to the southeast, in Washington) and the Coast Mountains (to the north).

History

Settlement
The first residents of the area are the Stó:lō Nation. The Upper Sumas 6 Indian reserve of the Sumas First Nation is located at Kilgard within Abbotsford city limits.

European settlement began when the Royal Engineers surveyed the area in response to the gold rush along the Fraser River in 1858. This led to the building of Yale Road (today Old Yale Road), the first transportation route to link the Fraser Valley. The settlement grew and the production of butter, milk and tobacco began by the late 1860s. In 1889, former Royal Engineer John Cunningham Maclure applied for a Crown grant to obtain the  that would become Abbotsford.

The Gur Sikh Temple, located on 33089 South Fraser Way, is the oldest Sikh temple in North America. Built in 1908 and opened in 1911, it is now over 110 years old, outlasting the now demolished 2nd Avenue temple in Vancouver (opened in 1908), and the Golden temple (opened in 1905) which was destroyed by fire.

There is some controversy over the origin of the Abbotsford name. The most commonly cited origin is that Maclure named the land "Abbotsford" after family friend Henry Braithwaite Abbott, the western superintendent of the Canadian Pacific Railway. Maclure's sons later stated that the property had actually been named for Sir Walter Scott's home, Abbotsford House, and pronounced it with the accent on ford, In his later years Maclure himself claimed that the naming had been "a combination of two ideas". The Akriggs say that Maclure in an 1844 letter said that when the town was laid out in 1844, the town was named for Henry Abbott, general superintendent of the CPR and brother of Sir John Abbott, prime minister.

Contemporary period  

The title passed hands to Robert Ward, who filed a townsite subdivision on July 9, 1891. Also in 1891, the CPR built a railway line through the area that connected Mission with the Seattle, Lake Shore and Eastern Railway at Sumas, Washington. This route was the only rail connection between Vancouver and Seattle until 1904. The Village of Abbotsford was incorporated in 1892. At that time Robert Ward sold many of the lots to private investors, but also sold off a significant portion to the Great Northern Railway's subsidiary company the Vancouver, Victoria and Eastern Railway. The British Columbia Electric Railway (BCER) arrived in 1910. The Interurban, as the BCER tram linking Abbotsford with Vancouver and Chilliwack was called, was discontinued in 1950, but BCER's successor BC Hydro retains the right to re-introduce passenger rail service. Service to Vancouver runs from neighbouring Mission by way of the West Coast Express.

The most notable natural disaster to hit Abbotsford was a major flood of the Fraser River in 1948.

In September 1984, Pope John Paul II held an open-air Mass for over 200,000 people at Abbotsford International Airport.

The amalgamation of the Village of Abbotsford and the District of Sumas into the District of Abbotsford occurred in 1972. The District of Abbotsford amalgamated with the District of Matsqui in 1995 to become the City of Abbotsford, raising the population significantly.

In June 2013, the City of Abbotsford spread chicken manure on a homeless camp located in the city. Abbotsford Mayor Bruce Banman publicly apologized for the incident. A lawsuit was launched on behalf of some of the homeless, stating that a bylaw which prevents overnight camping in Abbotsford parks is against their right to shelter. The city has formed a homelessness action plan, and has approved a proposal for a supportive housing facility.

The city of Abbotsford has a long and ongoing history of gang-related crime, particularly that of violence and the illegal sale of controlled substances.

On November 16, 2021, Abbotsford residents living in the Sumas Prairie were given an evacuation order given the flooding in British Columbia at the time, the city calling the situation "catastrophic".

Government

Abbotsford City Council comprises a council-manager form of local government. The mayor and council were last elected in 2018. The current mayor Henry Braun, was re-elected with 56.91% of the popular vote. Councillors elected in 2018 were: Patricia Ross (9.8%), Les Barkman (6.42%), Moe Gill (6.15%), Ross Siemens (6.04%), Brenda Falk (5.72%), Dave Loewen (5.59%), Kelley Chahal (5.21%), and Sandy Blue (5.16%). School trustees elected are: Cindy Schafer (9.72%), Stan Petersen (9.39%), Shirley Wilson (9.04%), Rhonda Pauls (8.89%), Preet S. Rai (8.74%), Freddy Latham (8.29%), and Phil Anderson (7.55%).

The Abbotsford flag and coat of arms are the same, featuring straight, diagonal crosses representing Abbotsford as at a "crossroads". At the centre is a strawberry blossom to symbolize the local berry industry. The flag of Abbotsford was originally blue in colour. The change to green was initiated in 1995 when the District of Abbotsford and the District of Matsqui amalgamated to create the City of Abbotsford.

Demographics

City of Abbotsford 

The 2021 census reported that immigrants (individuals born outside Canada) comprise 43,190 persons or 28.6% of the total population of Abbotsford. Of the total immigrant population, the top countries of origin were India (23,830 persons or 55.2%), United Kingdom (2,310 persons or 5.3%), Philippines (1,735 persons or 4.0%), United States of America (1,395 persons or 3.2%), Netherlands (895 persons or 2.1%), Vietnam (885 persons or 2.0%), South Korea (850 persons or 2.0%), China (845 persons or 2.0%), Germany (820 persons or 1.9%), and Pakistan (565 persons or 1.3%).

Languages 
According to the 2021 Census, 92,460 persons or 61.0% of Abbotsford's population have English as a mother tongue; Punjabi is the mother tongue of 34,280 persons or 22.6% of the population, followed by German (3,065 or 2.0%), Spanish (1,375 or 0.9%), Korean (1,190 or 0.8%), Tagalog (1,180 or 0.8%), Vietnamese (1,105 or 0.7%), Dutch (990 or 0.7%), French (955 or 0.6%), Mandarin (945 or 0.6%), Hindi (860 or 0.5%), Arabic (720 or 0.5%), Cantonese (555 or 0.4%), Russian (415 or 0.3%), and Urdu (400 or 0.3%).

Furthermore, the 2021 census stated 141,175 persons or 93.6% of Abbotsford's population have knowledge of the English language; 41,145 persons or 27.3% of the population have knowledge of the Punjabi language, followed by Hindi (7,080 or 4.7%), French (6,295 or 4.2%), German (3,665 or 2.4%), Spanish (2,880 or 1.9%), Tagalog (1,835 or 1.2%), Korean (1,430 or 0.9%), Vietnamese (1,170 or 0.8%), Dutch (1,145 or 0.8%), Mandarin (1,430 or 0.9%), Arabic (1,030 or 0.7%), Urdu (985 or 0.7%), Cantonese (810 or 0.5%), and Russian (805 or 0.5%).

Religion 
A plurality of Abbotsford's population is Christian. Many of the largest congregations in the city are Mennonite Brethren.

The next largest religious group is Sikh. Opened in 1911, the city contains the oldest existing Sikh Gurdwara built in Canada and North America, with earlier Gurdwaras built in Kitsilano (1908) and Golden (1905) since being demolished or destroyed by fire. A National Historic Site, located in Central Abbotsford, the Gur Sikh Temple is now over 110 years old.

The 2021 census reported the religious demography in the city of Abbotsford was:
Christianity (56,900 persons or 37.7%)
Irreligion (47,550 persons or 31.5%)
Sikhism (38,395 persons or 25.5%)
Hinduism (3,620 persons or 2.4%)
Islam (2,125 persons or 1.4%)
Buddhism (1,000 persons or 0.7%)
Judaism (90 persons or 0.1%)
Indigenous Spirituality (75 persons or <0.1%)
Other (1,060 persons or 0.7%)

Ethnicity 
According to the 2021 census, the largest pan-ethnic group is European, comprising approximately 55.2% of the municipal population. This group includes German, Dutch, British, Irish, Scandinavian and Slavic ethnic origins.

The next largest pan-ethnic group in Abbotsford is South Asian, comprising 30.2% of the city population; this group includes India, Pakistan, Bangladesh, Nepal, Bhutan, Maldives and Sri Lanka national origins, while the population in Abbotsford primarily includes persons of Punjabi ethnic origin. Members of the ethnic group first arrived in the early 1900s to work on farms and in the lumber industry.

This is followed by Indigenous peoples at 4.6% of the population, Southeast Asians (3.1%), and East Asians (2.7%).

Abbotsford CMA 

The 2021 Canadian census reported that immigrants (individuals born outside Canada) comprise 50,085 persons or 26.1% of the total population of the Abbotsford-Mission CMA. Of the total immigrant population, the top countries of origin were India (25,990 persons or 51.9%), United Kingdom (3,295 persons or 6.6%), Philippines (2,065 persons or 4.1%), United States of America (1,725 persons or 3.4%), Germany (1,085 persons or 2.2%), Netherlands (1,070 persons or 2.1%), Vietnam (1,040 persons or 2.1%), China (990 persons or 2.0%), South Korea (930 persons or 1.9%), and Pakistan (600 persons or 1.2%).

Ethnicity 
Abbotsford has the third highest proportion of visible minorities among Census Metropolitan Areas in Canada, after the Greater Toronto Area and Greater Vancouver. The Abbotsford metropolitan area has Canada's highest Census Metropolitan Area proportion of South Asians.

Climate
Abbotsford has an oceanic climate (Köppen climate type Cfb), with just enough summer precipitation not to be classified as warm-summer mediterranean. Summers are generally warm and drier than at other times of the year and winters are rainy and very mild by Canadian standards. Snowfall can be heavy but usually not very long lasting, on average falling mostly in December and January.

Economy

Some 62 percent of residents in Abbotsford work in the City of Abbotsford itself. Most of the remaining 38 percent commute to Mission, Chilliwack or Vancouver and its suburbs (primarily Surrey and Langley). More than 25 percent of Abbotsford's workforce commutes to Abbotsford from other municipalities.

The Conference Board of Canada has identified the local economy as one of the most diverse in the country. Abbotsford's main industries are agriculture, transportation, manufacturing and retail. The city earns the highest dollar per acre of agricultural land in the country, greater than the Niagara Region and the North Okanagan. Total sales from agricultural businesses grew from $635,000,000 in 2010 to nearly $1billion as of 2021 and accounts for almost 50% of all chicken eggs and dairy milk production for all of British Columbia.

The BC government's Animal Health Centre, at the Abbotsford Agriculture Centre offers "more than 400 laboratory diagnostic tests for agents that may be found in wild and domestic birds, mammals, fish, reptiles and amphibians" and is the leading accredited full-service veterinary laboratory in Western Canada. The facility has housed a Biosafety level 3 laboratory since October 2009.

Abbotsford Regional Hospital and Cancer Centre and community health services make Fraser Health the city's largest employer with about 2,500 staff. The city is also home to three federal prisons, each of which employs between 200 and 500 officers and support staff. There is also a growing aerospace industry led by Cascade Aerospace and Conair Group Inc.

Local and privately owned confectionery company Brookside Foods was acquired by The Hershey Company in 2011. In 2016, it announced it would be closing.

Education

Forty-six public elementary, middle, and secondary schools are administered by the Abbotsford School District. This includes a virtual school called the "Abbotsford Virtual School" that offers more than 30 semestered online courses. This school offers a unique animation and modeling program that teaches students aspects of the video game industry.

Private schools include Dasmesh Punjabi School, St. John Brebeuf Regional Secondary, Mennonite Educational Institute, and Abbotsford Christian School.

Post-secondary institutions in the city include the University of the Fraser Valley, religious institutions such as Columbia Bible College and Summit Pacific College, as well as career colleges such as Career Gate Community College, Sprott Shaw College, Vancouver Career College, Métis Skills and Employment Centre, and CDI College.

Arts, culture and heritage

The Abbotsford Arts Council hosts a number of free local events including music in Mill Lake Park, the Arty Awards and more recently, the Christmas Artisan Gift Fair. It has been involved in projects such as the Abbotsford "Unity Statue", Abbotsford Christmas Craft Fair, Art in the Park, Abbotsford's Art and Heritage Unity Festival, and the Historical Downtown Art Bench Project. As well as maintaining the Kariton Art Gallery which features and hosts exhibitions from local artists of all mediums residing in the Lower Mainland.

The Reach Gallery Museum features exhibitions from across Canada and around the world, as well as the work of local artists. It houses a heritage archive, runs special events, programs and courses and seeks to promote local arts and culture.

Trethewey House Heritage Site features a restored 1920s Craftsman-style house built by J.O. Trethewey, one of the owners of the lumber and shingle mill that gave Mill Lake Park its name. The municipally designated heritage house and adjacent gallery are open to the public for special events, educational programming, and drop-in tours.

The Mennonite Heritage Museum, which opened in January 2016, features a permanent exhibit that tells the 500-year-old story of the Anabaptist/Mennonite movement, with a particular focus on the history of those Mennonites who settled in Abbotsford beginning in the early 1930s. The Museum also has a gallery that features the work of local Mennonite artists, a coffee shop serving traditional Mennonite foods, a bookstore, and a replica traditional Mennonite housebarn that includes a permanent exhibit focusing on Mennonites and agriculture. The Museum is also home to the library and archive of the Mennonite Historical Society of British Columbia.

Gallery 7 Theatre and Performing Arts has been one of Abbotsford only performing arts organizations since 1991 and operates out of Mennonite Educational Institute. They produce four mainstage productions every year.

Transportation
Public bus transportation is provided by the Central Fraser Valley Transit System. Passenger rail service to Vancouver currently runs from nearby Mission by way of the West Coast Express.

Air links are provided by the Abbotsford International Airport. WestJet provides regular scheduled service from the airport, due to its proximity to Vancouver's eastern suburbs. The airport is also the home of the annual Abbotsford International Airshow.

Major transportation routes leading into Abbotsford are the Trans-Canada Highway (No. 1), the Abbotsford-Mission Highway (No. 11) and the Fraser Highway (No. 1A). Access to the United States is via the Sumas–Huntingdon Border Crossing.

Media

Due to its proximity to Vancouver, most Vancouver television and radio stations are also available in Abbotsford, although in a few cases there are repeater stations licensed to different centres in the region.

Radio 
Two radio stations originate from Abbotsford: CIVL-FM, campus radio station of the University of the Fraser Valley, and country music station CKQC-FM.

Print
 The Abbotsford News
 The Abbotsford Times (ceased publication in December 2013)
 The Punjabi Patrika

Online
 Abbotsford Today
Fraser Valley Current

Sports

Hockey 
Abbotsford Minor Hockey is one of the largest associations in British Columbia with more than 1000 players registered from the ages of 5 through 18 years old. This association is recognized by many as a model and a leader in the development of minor hockey programs, and several Abbotsford-raised players have gone on to the highest levels of this sport. In the 2005–06 hockey season, Abbotsford's bantam AAA team were ultimately the Western Canadian Bantam Champions, and eight individual players from this team (the most ever) were selected in the 2006 WHL Bantam Draft.

The Abbotsford Pilots of the Pacific International Junior Hockey League (junior B level) play at MSA Arena, which is Abbotsford's second largest arena at just over 400 seats. Abbotsford was considered as a possible home for the Chilliwack Chiefs (junior A), who were forced to move in 2006 when the Chilliwack Bruins (a WHL expansion team) took over their arena, Prospera Centre. Abbotsford would have become the home of the Chiefs if the city had supported them in building a new arena; instead, the Chiefs moved to Langley. Construction has now been completed in Abbotsford on a far bigger sports and entertainment centre (with 7,500 seats).

From 2009 until 2014, Abbotsford hosted the NHL's Calgary Flames' American Hockey League (AHL) affiliate, the Abbotsford Heat. Home games were played at the Abbotsford Entertainment & Sports Centre.

On May 6, 2021, the NHL's Vancouver Canucks were approved to relocate their AHL affiliate to Abbotsford for the 2021–22 season as the Abbotsford Canucks.

Other sports 
From 2012 and 2013, the BC Angels of the Legends Football League's LFL Canada division played at the Abbotsford Entertainment & Sports Centre.

Abbotsford's Jane and Gerry Swan Track at Rotary Stadium is home to the Valley Royals Track & Field Club, who have produced numerous Olympians including two for the 2008 Olympics. Rotary Stadium was also home to the now-defunct Abbotsford Air Force of the Canadian Junior Football League.

Abbotsford has a superior youth soccer program, winning two national titles, and numerous provincial titles. It is also home of soccer all-stars Sophie Schmidt, Brad Petoom and Adam Lang. Abbotsford is home to the Abbotsford Mariners of the United Soccer Leagues Premier Development League, the highest level of amateur soccer in North America.

Abbotsford is home to many high school sports, with Abbotsford Senior Secondary School, W.J. Mouat Secondary, Rick Hansen Secondary, Robert Bateman Secondary, St. John Brebeuf Secondary, Yale Secondary, and the Mennonite Educational Institute, among others, doing very well in track and field, volleyball, basketball, and football. These schools have consistently ranked among the highest in the province. The Yale Secondary senior boys basketball team, under Coach Al Friesen, won the 2008 'AAA' provincial boys' basketball championship.

Abbotsford's rugby club supports three men's teams, two women's teams, U19 men's and women's, U15 U16 and U17 men's, and a great mini rugby program. Many of Abbotsford's players have gone on to play for Canada, such as Erin Lockwood, Ryan McWhinney, Scott Hunter and Brodie Henderson.

In Olympic sports, Abbotsford's Alana Kraus has won medals in short-track speed skating.

Crime

In 2005, the Abbotsford–Mission metropolitan area had the highest property crime rate and the second highest violent crime rate for cities with a population of 100,000 to 500,000 in Canada.

The metropolitan area had the highest rate of homicides nationally for two years running (2008 and 2009) with a rate of 5.22 homicides per 100,000 population, compared with the national average of 1.81. In 2010, the rate was 2.3.

The City of Abbotsford has its own municipal police force, one of eleven municipal police forces in British Columbia. It is the third largest municipal police force in British Columbia (behind Vancouver and Victoria). , the Abbotsford Police Department employed nearly 200 officers and 80 civilian employees.

The Abbotsford Police Department was officially formed in 1995 when the District of Matsqui and the District of Abbotsford amalgamated to become the City of Abbotsford. Prior to the amalgamation, the District of Matsqui was patrolled by the Matsqui police and the District of Abbotsford by the RCMP. During the referendum citizens elected to keep a municipal police force.

Cityscape

These places represent parts of the city that have more than one neighbourhood in them.

 Abbotsford East
 Abbotsford West
 Aberdeen
 Bradner
 Central Abbotsford
 Matsqui
 Poplar
 Sumas Mountain
 Sumas Prairie

Neighbourhoods

 Aberdeen
 Arnold
 Auguston
 Blueridge
 Bradner
 Clayburn
 Clearbrook
 Downtown
 Eagle Mountain
 Gifford
 Glen Mountain
 Huntingdon
 Kilgard
 Matsqui
 McKinley Heights
 Mill Lake
 Mount Lehman
 North Poplar
 Peardonville
 Pepin Brook
 Sandy Hill
 South Poplar
 Straiton
 Townline

Sister cities
 Fukagawa, Hokkaidō, Japan

Notable people 

 Bacon Brothers (gangsters)
 Karen Lee Batten
 Chase Claypool
 Ryan Craig
 Kyle Cumiskey
 Frank Davey
 Sunny Dhinsa
 Dianne Doan
 Brian Doerksen
 Jacob Doerksen
 Burkely Duffield
 Victoria Duffield
 Jared Falk
 Michael Funk
 Amy Gough
 Derek Grant
 Adam Hadwin
 Charles Hill-Tout
 Jacob Hoggard
 Marek Klassen
 Chad Kroeger
 Evangeline Lilly
 Brad Moran
 Greg Neufeld
 Larry Nickel
 Gladys Powers
 Jordan Pritchett
 Nathan Lieuwen
 Mauro Ranallo
 Sophie Schmidt
 Jared Slingerland
 Devon Toews
 David Van der Gulik
 Jake Virtanen
 Shane Wiebe

See also
 Coat of arms of Abbotsford, British Columbia
 Mission Bridge
 Mission Railway Bridge
 Sumas Lake
 Sumas Prairie

Notes

References

External links

 
Cities in British Columbia
Populated places established in 1892